Mahakam Ulu Regency is a regency (kabupaten) in the province of East Kalimantan, Indonesia. It covers an area of 15,315 km2. The regency was established on 14 December 2012, partitioned from West Kutai Regency. The districts now forming the regency held a combined population of 24,994 at the 2010 Census; the population for the new regency at the 2020 Census was 32,513; the official estimate as at mid 2021 was 32,969. The administrative capital was Ujoh Bilang.

Administrative districts 
The regency is divided into five districts (kecamatan), tabulated below with their areas and their populations at the 2010 Census and 2020 Census. 
Notable villages include the twin villages of Tiong Ohang and Tiong Bu'u in Long Apari District. The table also includes the locations of the district administrative centres, the number of villages (desa) in each district, and its post code.

References